Géza Herczegh (17 October 1928 - 11 January 2010) was a Hungarian judge and academic. In 1990, Herczegh was appointed to the Constitutional Court of Hungary. From 1993 to 2003, he was unanimously elected by the United Nations to one of the International Court of Justice, succeeding Manfred Lachs. He filled the remaining year of Lachs' nine year term and was re-elected to a full term in 1994. In 2003, he was succeeded by Peter Tomka. His daughter, Judge Anita Herczegh, is married to János Áder, former President of Hungary. His successor at the ICJ, Tomka, described him as "a dedicated and open-minded judge interested in finding areas of consensus."

References

International Court of Justice judges
20th-century Hungarian lawyers
1928 births
2010 deaths
Constitutional Court of Hungary judges
Hungarian judges of international courts and tribunals